2C-I is a psychedelic phenethylamine of the 2C family. It was first synthesized by Alexander Shulgin and described in his 1991 book PiHKAL (Phenethylamines I Have Known and Loved). The drug has been used recreationally as psychedelic and other reported effects and was sometimes confused with the more potent chemical cousin 25I-NBOMe, nicknamed "Smiles," in the media.

Recreational use

In the early 2000s, 2C-I was sold in Dutch smart shops after the drug 2C-B was banned.

According to the US Drug Enforcement Administration, 2C-I is taken orally or snorted in a powder form.

Drug prohibition laws

European Union

In December 2003, the European Council issued a binding order compelling all EU member states to ban 2C-I within three months.

Canada
As of October 31, 2016, 2C-I is a controlled substance (Schedule III) in Canada.

Australia
2C-I is a schedule 9 prohibited substance in Australia under the Poisons Standard (October 2015). A schedule 9 drug is outlined in the Poisons Act 1964 as "Substances which may be abused or misused, the manufacture, possession, sale or use of which should be prohibited by law except when required for medical or scientific research, or for analytical, teaching or training purposes with approval of the CEO".

Sweden
Sveriges riksdag added 2C-I to schedule I ("substances, plant materials and fungi which normally do not have medical use") as a narcotic on March 16, 2004, published by the Medical Products Agency in their regulation LVFS 2004:3.

United Kingdom
In the United Kingdom, 2C-I is controlled as a Class A substance.

United States
As of July 9, 2012, in the United States 2C-I is a Schedule I substance under the Synthetic Drug Abuse Prevention Act of 2012, making possession, distribution and manufacture illegal. A previous bill, introduced in March 2011, that would have done the same passed the House of Representatives, but was not passed by the Senate.

Analogues and derivatives
DOI

See also
 Recreational drug use

References

External links
 Erowid 2C-I Vault
 Una experiencia con 2C-I de los Shulgin (In Spanish)
 2C-I Entry in PiHKAL
 2C-I Entry in PiHKAL • info

2C (psychedelics)
Designer drugs
Iodoarenes
O-methylated phenols